David M. Arnot  is a Canadian senator from Saskatchewan, serving since July 2021. A lawyer and judge, Arnot previously served as the chief commissioner of the Saskatchewan Human Rights Commission since 2009, and was previously a judge on the provincial court, federal treaty commissioner (1997 to 2007), and crown prosecutor. He is a graduate of the University of Saskatchewan and was admitted to the bar in 1976. On July 29, 2021, it was announced that he would be appointed to the Senate of Canada by Governor General Mary Simon, on the advice of prime minister Justin Trudeau.

References

1952 births
Living people
Canadian senators from Saskatchewan
Independent Canadian senators
Politicians from Brandon, Manitoba